Adrián Kopičár (born 13 January 1997) is a Slovak footballer who plays for FK Blansko as a midfielder.

Club career

ŠK Slovan Bratislava
Kopičár made his professional debut for Slovan Bratislava against FO ŽP Šport Podbrezová on 20 May 2016, as a substitute in the 65th minute of the match.

References

External links
 ŠK Slovan Bratislava official club profile
 
 Futbalnet profile

1997 births
Living people
Slovak footballers
Association football midfielders
MŠK Žilina players
ŠK Slovan Bratislava players
FK Senica players
FK Železiarne Podbrezová players
FC ŠTK 1914 Šamorín players
FK Blansko players
Slovak Super Liga players
2. Liga (Slovakia) players
Czech National Football League players
People from Čadca
Sportspeople from the Žilina Region